Anthony Fabrice Angély (born 21 March 1990) is a professional footballer who plays as a forward for Régional 1 club ES Buxerolles. Born in metropolitan France, he is a former Martinique international.

Club career
Born in Paris, Angély played for Martiniquais sides Essor-Préchotain and Club Colonial for five and three years respectively. He was top scorer of the Martinique Championnat National in his final season with Club Colonial, but lost in the Coupe de la Martinique final, despite scoring. In 2016, Angély moved back to France to join Royan Vaux Atlantique FC. He would go on to play for Poitiers, Châteaubriant, Chauvigny, Châtellerault, and ES Buxerolles.

International career
Angély made his international debut for Martinique in a 2–1 loss to Guadeloupe on 3 March 2012. He scored his first goal in a 3–1 win over French Guiana.

Career statistics

International

International goals
Scores and results list Martinique's goal tally first.

References

External links

 
 

1990 births
Living people
Footballers from Paris
Association football forwards
Martiniquais footballers
Martinique international footballers
French footballers
French people of Martiniquais descent
2017 CONCACAF Gold Cup players
Essor-Préchotain players
Club Colonial players
Stade Poitevin FC players
SO Châtellerault players
US Chauvigny players
Voltigeurs de Châteaubriant players
Championnat National 3 players
Régional 1 players